Hotel Trubble is a British children's sitcom made by the BBC and broadcast on its flagship children and young person's channel CBBC. It stars Dominique Moore as Sally, the receptionist; Gary Damer as Lenny; Sam Phillips as Jamie, the bellboy; and Tanya Franks as Dolly and Sheila Bernette as Mrs. Poshington, a guest who never leaves (and who becomes the hotel's cleaner in series two and three). It is a farce sitcom. A total of 39 episodes have aired on TV between December 2008 and August 2011. Many guest stars have appeared, including Tom Price, Josie d'Arby, Miranda Hart, Stephen Evans, Steve Furst, Steve Marsh, Dan Wright, Les Dennis, Phil Cornwell, and Susan Wokoma who played new regular 'Daisy' in Series 3.

Reruns have not been broadcast on CBBC since late-2013.

Characters

Jamie
Jamie (Sam Phillips) is the bellboy of Hotel Trubble and probably the one with the most common sense, he does at some parts, have a lack of confidence and panics. He also does embarrassing things when he is in a panic. He is always the first person to yell "Noooooo!" when its time to panic. He was also like Sally, nominated, but for being the best bellboy. He is sensitive, has strong emotions like the time Verity Lumiere kissed him. Jamie is a good character and always means well. He is probably the most normal of the threesome. It is shown on several occasions that he has romantic feelings for Sally – for example in "Super Trubble", he shouts "Don't hurt the woman I love!" after Lionel shoots her with an arrow, only to correct himself moments later.  Sally and Jamie are technically married after an accident with a mix-up between a fake and real vicar. It's shown that Jamie is very over-enthusiastic about his work, as in one episode it is noted that he never wears anything other than his uniform; it can only be assumed he has a wardrobe somewhere full of identical blue suits.

Sally
Sally (Dominique Moore) is the receptionist of the hotel. She can be troublesome and often arrogant, but well-meaning, and is arguably the smartest out of the staff. Although glamorous, she finds life at the hotel dull, and prefers to read gossip magazines in spare time. She has shown an interest in acting and dancing, despite having no talent in either; her only role has been a sheep in her school's production of Cinderella. She and Jamie have shown an occasional attraction to one another - in one episode she displayed gratitude when he helps her out of a tight spot and flirted with him.

Lenny
Leonard "Lenny" Lemon, (Gary Damer) is the eccentric member of the trio, often serving as the comic relief. He is the most unintelligent out of the group, he regularly manages to mess up things for his mates, asking strange people for advice, and takes numerous directions and comments too literally. However, he is good-hearted and hard working; but this does not necessarily mean his efforts go to plan.

Dolly
Dolly (Tanya Franks, Series 2-3) is Mr Trubble's fiancée who first appeared in series two. A rich woman, she is effectively Hotel Trubble's manager, and is always coming up with odd business ideas including a toilet made out of flowers and hosting exclusive parties at the hotel. She is seen as rather dimwitted, and is clearly disliked by Mrs. Poshington, Jamie and Sally - Lenny gets on best with her due to their low common sense, often being roped into helping with her schemes. In series 3, it is discovered she used to be a successful singer in Japan, performing under the name "Yolly Dolly".

Mrs. Poshington
Mrs. Poshington (Sheila Bernette) is a guest, who literally never leaves. Every morning she asks pointless questions and she claims to be a marathon runner, running the London Marathon 30 years ago (in 2009) even though it was established in 1981, the Queen's cousin, a former actress and a grandmother. In a few episodes, she helps Sally, Lenny and Jamie with solutions to their problems. Mrs. Poshington seems to be demanding, but kind-hearted and filled with willpower. She loses her entire fortune in series 2 and is allowed to stay at the hotel as long as she is the new cleaner. In "Time Trubble", it is revealed she's had eight husbands; all of which died in suspicious circumstances. Mrs. Poshington is not a great cleaner as it shows in episodes 13 (4011); her video shows her breaking various items.

General Sirius Poshington
General Sirius Poshington is a stuffed cat belonging to Mrs. Poshington. She does not seem to realize that he is not real and she pushes him on a wagon. Mrs Poshington says things like "Sirius doesn't like running, he likes the cycling trips we go on together". She even asks Sally to look after him for her when she goes out and calls frequently during this period to ask how he is in series 1 and 2. In "Fashion Phonies", Jamie says Sirius will never walk again.

Mr. Trubble
Mr. Trubble owns Hotel Trubble and calls very often on a special red phone with a siren instead of a bell or tone caller. Once, he threatens to fire Sally, Jamie and Lenny if they don't give him a good birthday party. Mrs. Poshington is responsible and is told that she will lose her room if the party isn't good. In one episode the Trubble diamond is brought in by an impostor who tries to steal it. He first tries to accuse Sally and then Lenny. Mr. Trubble does not have a particular personality as he is never shown and is heard only as a shouting, unintelligible voice over the phone, a la the General in the Hanna-Barbera cartoon series Dastardly and Muttley in their Flying Machines.

Chef
Like Mr. Trubble, Chef is never seen and is represented only as a shouting unintelligible voice emanating from behind the double doors leading to the kitchen. He would seem to be an extremely hostile individual, as whenever Jamie or Lenny enters the kitchen to speak to him, there is always a lot of shouting before they emerge looking rather frightened or covered in something. He is French.

Daisy
Daisy is the new receptionist, first appearing in the series 3 episode "American President". She is an animal rights activist who has kidnapped an elephant from London Zoo, and is on the run from the police. Daisy is plotting to smuggle the elephant, which she has named Trunky and has hidden in room 360, back to the jungle where the two of them can start a new life together. She states that Sally found out her secret, thus prompting her to kidnap Sally and post her to Guatemala so that she would not be found out. The rest of the characters are unaware of all of this, despite regular elephant noises coming from room 360. In "Fashion Phonies", the characters receive a postcard from Sally in Guatemala saying "DON'T TRUST THE RECEPTIONIST!", but Daisy tells them it's actually Guatemalan for "Ahh, lovely time". 
Note: The character of Daisy, played by Susan Wokoma, was introduced when Dominique Moore had to leave the show during recording of series 3 to have treatment for Hodgkin's Lymphoma. The scripts were rewritten so that Sally would not have to appear (though she would still be referred to in dialogue), incorporating the underlying sub-plot of Daisy having kidnapped an elephant and Sally's absence being explained by her having been sent to Guatemala by Daisy.

Episodes

Series overview

Series 1 (2008–09)

Series 2 (2010)

Series 3 (2011)

References

External links

Hotel Trubble Movie, TV, Episode database
Hotel Trubble UK TV Guide

BBC children's television shows
BBC high definition shows
2000s British children's television series
2010s British children's television series
2008 British television series debuts
2011 British television series endings
British children's comedy television series
British children's drama television series
English-language television shows
Television series set in hotels
Fictional hotels